Rushall is a small hamlet in Herefordshire, England. It is approximately halfway between Woolhope and Much Marcle.

Notes

References 

Hamlets in Herefordshire